Rujm al-Shami is a town in the Amman Governorate in northwestern Jordan.

References

Populated places in Amman Governorate